The Dauphin Clinic Pharmacy Classic was an annual bonspiel, or curling tournament, that took place at the Dauphin Curling Club in Dauphin, Manitoba. The tournament was held in a triple-knockout format. The tournament was part of the World Curling Tour. Curlers from Manitoba dominated the event.

Past champions
Only skip's name is displayed.

External links
Event Home Page
Dauphin Curling Club Home Page

Sport in Dauphin, Manitoba
Former World Curling Tour events
Curling in Manitoba